Arpino may refer to a number of Italian places:
 Arpino, in the province of Frosinone
 Sant'Arpino, in the province of Caserta
 A subdivision (frazione) of Casoria, in the province of Naples
and to people:
 Gerald Arpino (1923–2008), U.S. choreographer and ballet company director
 Giovanni Arpino (1927–1987), writer and journalist
 Cavalièr d'Arpino, born Giuseppe Cesari (1568–1640), Italian Mannerist painter